Thomaz (real name Thomas Erik Viktor Ransmyr; born 15 June 1973) is a Swedish artist and author working from The Netherlands. Through the years, he has worked within theatre and music with a wide width (from musical to electro) in collaborations with people such as Marco Manieri, Kristian Anttila, Robert Engstrand (Liberator, Turisas) and Scottish Simon Bloomfield from the group Rezillos (where he was a member under the name "Simon Templar)".

Ransmyr was born in Skanör, Sweden.  His mother's father was the painter Carl-Eric Lindbergh.  On his mother's side he is related to Charles Lindbergh.

On stage he has been involved in the musical Elvira Madigan (1992) at Malmö Stadsteater, In Studioteaterns musical Cabaret (1993–1995), The Bonateaterns Trettondagsafton (Shakespeare's "Twelfth Night", 1997), the horror play Murder (2004) and in Darling Desperados´ Hollyroodfruar at Fakiren in Malmö and at Stockholms stadsteater. The longest engagement was as living ghost in the ghost house, Spökhuset, at the tivoli Gröna Lund between 1999 and 2004.

On film he has been seen in Bo Widerbergs Lust och fägring stor (nominated for an Oscar as "best foreign film" under the title "All Things Fair") and in the cult movies Kraftverk 3714 and Farligt förflutet. On TV he has been seen in, among other productions, Det grovmaskiga nätet and Ben & Gunnar.

Thomaz has been seen singing on Swedish TV4 performing songs made famous by Lill-Babs. In 2006 he released an odd version of the Melodifestivalen song "Stjärna På Himmelen" (Swedish for "Star in Heaven") which ended up nr 1 at cdon.se´s votinglist in 2006 and nr 8 at the gay magazine QX.se´s popularity list in 2006. A song in his native language, Swedish, is included on all of his records, and he usually sings one song in Swedish at every concert, no matter which country he sings in, which is very appreciated.

On the 2012 album "Nobody's Child", which as loneliness as theme, Thomaz sings in English and Dutch, and on the physical release a hidden song in Swedish. The sleeve picture was taken outside his hometown Skanör in Skåne. On the record he is once again collaborating with Scottish Simon Bloomfield (ex-Rezillos), Swedish Marco Manieri and performing a duet with Swedish pop star Kristian Anttila. The first videos were made by film-maker Fred Anderson.
The official release of the album was held at the Royal Vauxhall Tavern in London, UK, in April 2012.

17 August 2012 Thomaz represented Sweden in the Copenhagen Pride alternative music competition "Pride MGP" at Rådhuspladsen, Copenhagen, Denmark with the Östen Warnerbring-song "Som En Dröm" and ended up shared 5th.

Thomaz is also one of the models in photographer Elisabeth Ohlson Wallins famous exhibition "Ecce homo" (1998).

In 2013 Thomaz performed in United Kingdom, Argentina, The Netherlands, Estonia and Sweden. Previously he has performed in Denmark and Poland as well. In 2013 he performed live on British radio broadcast from Marlow.

Discography 

1992 – Elvira Madigan (Live, ensemble).
1996 – Monument 2 (Memento Materia) (as "Aelita").
2006 Stjärna på himmelen (Thundering Refrigerator Records).
2006 If I Ever Die (Thundering Refrigerator Records).
2009 5 Years of Art Performance Production ("Your Love Is Killing Me").
2012 Nobody's Child (Thundering Refrigerator Records) (iTunes Sweden: #69, #117).
2014 Har du cancer?
2020 Dikt & Förbannad Lögn

Bibliography 
 Vill Du Bära Min Kofta?

References 
Swedish film database

Art Performance Official site
Thomaz at Independent Swedish Music Association
Thomaz collaboration with Kristian Anttila
Thomaz collaboration with Simon Bloomfield of The Rezillos

External links 
Intervju med Thomaz i tidningen "Vi På Näset" 2012
Vulkan Publishing
Interview about "Vill Du Bära Min Kofta?"
Report from a gig
Official Facebook fansite

Swedish artists
Living people
1973 births
21st-century Swedish singers
21st-century Swedish male singers